Sabzak Pass is a mountain pass in Afghanistan. It is located in the mountain range of Paropamisu, north of Herat and south of Badghis of Paropamisu. It has an altitude of 2517 metres from sea level.

The Ring Road highway, which connects Herat and Qal'eh-ye Now, travels through Sabzak Pass. The road between the two cities, called "Lapis route", is 157 kilometres long. The road is in poor condition and is unpaved for most of the route. The route crosses the pass as a winding dirt road next to a gorge.

See also 
 Battle of Sabzak

References

External links 

  Wikimedia Commons hosts a multimedia category about Sabzak Pass.

Mountain passes of Afghanistan